The XI European and Mediterranean Indoor Archery Championships were held in Turin, Italy from March 3 to 8, 2008.

Schedule 
3 March 2008 – Delegation arrival, accreditation
4 March 2008 – Accreditation, Free shooting, opening ceremony
5 March 2008 – Qualification round
6 March 2008 – Elimination round
7 March 2008 – Juniors semifinals and finals, prize ceremony
8 March 2008 – Seniors semifinals and finals, prize ceremony, closing ceremony

Medal table

Medal summary

Men

Women

Participating nations 

  (2)
  (5)
  (6)
  (3)
  (6)
  (2)
  (4)
  (8)
  (7)
  (4)
  (12)
  (2)
  (6)
  (12)
  (1)
  (12)
  (1)
  (2)
  (3)
  (1)
  (1)
  (9)
  (4)
  (12)
  (1)
  (6)
  (12)
  (3)
  (6)
  (2)
  (5)
  (3)
  (9)
  (6)

References

External links
Torino 2008 The official site of the XI European and Mediterranean Archery Championships.
FITARCO, Italian Archery Federation.
EMAU, European and Mediterranean Archery Union.
Link to the RESULTS.

E
Sports competitions in Turin
2008 in Italian sport
International archery competitions hosted by Italy
Archery competitions in Europe
March 2008 sports events in Europe
2000s in Turin
International archery competitions